Mărtinești is a commune in Hunedoara County, Transylvania, Romania. It is composed of seven villages: Dâncu Mare (Nagydenk), Dâncu Mic (Kisdenk), Jeledinți (Lozsád), Măgura (Magura), Mărtinești, Tămășasa (Tamáspatak) and Turmaș (Tormás).

References

Communes in Hunedoara County
Localities in Transylvania